Rip It Up is a greatest hits album released by Dead or Alive in 1987 on Epic Records.  It contains eight singles from their two prior albums, Youthquake (1985) and Mad, Bad, and Dangerous to Know (1986), segued together much like a DJ-mix.  No new songs were included on this album, although the versions present here are alternate versions that were created by editing different 12-inch mixes together, creating unique track lengths and sounds.

A new Japanese version entitled Rip It Up +1 was released in 2004 that included one bonus track.

Track listing

References

External links
 

1987 greatest hits albums
Dead or Alive (band) compilation albums
Albums produced by Stock Aitken Waterman
Epic Records compilation albums